Edward Bernard Peter Buck (né Buckmelter; born August 24, 1954) is an American convicted felon and businessman. A former model and actor, he made a significant amount of money running and selling the data service company Gopher Courier. He became involved in politics after the election of Evan Mecham as Governor of Arizona in 1986; Buck, an Arizona resident, led the effort to recall him from office, accusing him of racism and corruption. The experience led Buck to change his party affiliation from Republican to Democrat, and he has since donated heavily to Democratic politicians. In 2007, he ran an unsuccessful campaign for the city council of West Hollywood, California.

Two African-American men, the first in 2017 and the second in 2019, were discovered dead in Buck's West Hollywood home, later to be determined as due to drug overdoses. Several reports indicated that Buck had a history of bringing African-American men to his house, where he would reportedly inject them with high doses of crystal methamphetamine for sexual gratification. He plied the men with drugs and then sexually assaulted them while they were unconscious or immobile. 

In January 2019, a coalition of 50 civil rights organizations called for law enforcement to investigate the matter. On September 17, 2019, Buck was arrested and charged with three counts of battery causing serious injury, administering methamphetamine and maintaining a drug house. He was convicted of nine federal charges in 2021; on April 14, 2022, Buck was sentenced to 30 years in prison.

Early life
Edward Bernard Peter Buckmelter was born in Steubenville, Ohio. He grew up in Phoenix, Arizona, where he was educated at North High School and graduated from Phoenix College.

Career
Buck began his career as a fashion model in Europe, where he also acted in television commercials and two movies. He worked for a friend's company, Rapid Information Services, before buying it out of bankruptcy for US$250,000 and renaming it Gopher Courier. Buck became a millionaire upon selling it after five years.

Buck led the campaign to impeach Arizona Republican Governor Evan Mecham in 1987 by founding the "Mecham Watchdog Committee". He announced the campaign on December 21, 1986, before Mecham had even been sworn in, and was the "leader" of a protest on the day of Mecham's inauguration. In particular, Buck highlighted Mecham's "opposition to a King holiday, his proposal for voluntary drug testing and his plan to reduce the state police force by up to 300 officers". Buck distributed bumper stickers that read "Mecham for Ex-Governor", and Arizona Attorney General Robert K. Corbin ruled that state employees were allowed to use them on their cars. The anti-Mecham campaign "made Buck a household name in Arizona" according to The Arizona Republic. In retaliation, Buck was attacked by Julian Sanders, the chairman of Arizonans for Traditional Family Values, over his homosexuality. Buck switched his registration from Republican to Democrat in 1988.

After moving to West Hollywood, California, Buck ran unsuccessfully for city council in 2007. He formerly served on the steering committee of the Stonewall Democratic Club. He has donated more than a total of $500,000 to political candidates and causes, almost all of them linked to the Democratic Party, including contributions to candidates like Hillary Clinton, Ted Lieu, Pete Aguilar, Adam B. Schiff, and Raja Krishnamoorthi as well as the Getting Things Done PAC.

Criminal investigations
On July 27, 2017, a young African-American man named Gemmel Moore died in Buck's apartment. Paramedics found Moore, who had worked as an escort, naked on a mattress in the living room with a "male pornography movie playing on the television", according to a Los Angeles County coroner's report. A spokesman for the coroner's office, Ed Winter, said Buck was inside his Laurel Avenue home at the time of Moore's death and that drug paraphernalia was recovered from the scene. Police found sex toys, syringes, and "clear plastic bags with suspected methamphetamine in a tool box roll-cabinet in the living room",  24 syringes with brown residue, five glass pipes with white residue and burn marks, a plastic straw with possible white residue, clear plastic bags with white powdery residue, and a clear plastic bag with a "piece of crystal-like substance". The death was investigated by the Los Angeles County Sheriff's Department, and Los Angeles County District Attorney Jackie Lacey declined to charge Buck on July 26, 2018. Jasmyne Cannick, a local writer, activist, and political candidate who investigated Moore's death, criticized Lacey's decision, writing on Twitter that any further deaths at Ed's residence would be Lacey's responsibility.

Since the death of Gemmel Moore, multiple reports have indicated that Buck had a history of luring young, Black gay men to his apartment, where he would inject them with crystal methamphetamine for sexual gratification.

On January 7, 2019, another African-American man, 55-year-old Timothy Michael Dean (a part-time adult film actor known professionally as Hole Hunter), died at Buck's home. Following Dean's death, a coalition of 50 civil rights organizations released a statement calling on local law enforcement to conduct a thorough investigation of Buck's role in the incident and calling on elected officials to return all contributions received from Buck.

Buck was arrested on September 17, 2019, and charged with three counts of battery causing serious injury, administering methamphetamine and maintaining a drug house, according to the Los Angeles County district attorney's office. He was accused of having injected a 37-year-old man, who overdosed but survived, with methamphetamine on September 11.

On September 19, 2019, a federal charge of "one count of distribution of methamphetamine resulting in death" was added by the United States for the death of Gemmel Moore, who died on July 27, 2017. That death had originally been ruled an accidental methamphetamine overdose by the Los Angeles County Department of Medical Examiner-Coroner.

On August 4, 2020, a federal grand jury charged Buck with four additional felonies, bringing the total number of federal charges to nine counts. Buck was scheduled to go to trial on January 19, 2021, but the date was postponed to April 20, 2021, due to COVID-19-related considerations.

On July 27, 2021, Buck was convicted of nine federal charges, including the deaths of Gemmel Moore and Timothy Dean, maintaining a drug den, distributing methamphetamines, and solicitation of prostitutes. On April 14, 2022, Buck was sentenced to 30 years in prison.

Personal life
Buck came out to his parents as gay at the age of 16. He changed his surname from Buckmelter to Buck in 1981 or 1983. He was the Grand Marshal of the 1989 International Gay Rodeo. Buck formerly lived near Piestewa Peak in Phoenix, Arizona. He moved to West Hollywood in 1991.

References

External links
 Donor Lookup for people named Ed Buck at OpenSecrets.org 
 Donor Lookup for people named Edward Buck at OpenSecrets.org
 Jasmyne Cannick's writings on the death of Gemmel Moore 

1954 births
Living people
20th-century American businesspeople
20th-century American male actors
21st-century American businesspeople
21st-century American criminals
Activists from California
American male models
American people convicted of drug offenses
American political activists
American political fundraisers
Arizona Democrats
Arizona Republicans
California Democrats
California politicians convicted of crimes
Candidates in the 2007 United States elections
Gay politicians
LGBT people from California
American LGBT politicians
North High School (Phoenix, Arizona) alumni
People from Steubenville, Ohio
People from West Hollywood, California
Phoenix College alumni
Prisoners and detainees of California
Violence against men in North America